Azdak (also Romanized as Āzdaḵ and Azdaq) is a village in Ayask Rural District, in the Central District of Sarayan County, South Khorasan Province, Iran. At the 2006 census, its population was 10, in 5 families.

References 

Populated places in Sarayan County